Ernest Louis of Hesse-Darmstadt (15 December 1667 – 12 September 1739) was Landgrave of Hesse-Darmstadt from 1678 to 1739. His parents were Landgrave Louis VI of Hesse-Darmstadt and Elisabeth Dorothea of Saxe-Gotha-Altenburg (1640–1709).

Ernest Louis's desire to emulate the French court under Louis XIV ran his country into debt. Among those patronized in this cultural milieu were the Baroque composer Christoph Graupner and the gambist Ernst Christian Hesse; also bringing into his service architect Louis Remy de la Fosse for his extensive building program. Upon his death in 1739, his country's debt was 4 million gulden, ten times the annual revenue.

Family
Ernest Louis married Dorothea Charlotte of Brandenburg-Ansbach (1661–1705), daughter of Albert II, Margrave of Brandenburg-Ansbach (1620–1667) on December 1, 1687. Their children were:
 Dorothea Sophie (1689–1723)
 married in 1710 Count John Frederick of Hohenlohe-Öhringen (1683–1765)
 Louis VIII, Landgrave of Hesse-Darmstadt (1691–1768)
 married in 1717 Countess Charlotte of Hanau-Lichtenberg (1700–1726)
 Charles William (1693–1707)
 Francis Ernest (1695–1716)
 Friederike Charlotte
 married in 1720 Landgrave Maximilian of Hesse-Kassel (1689–1753)

Ernest Louis married his second wife Luise Sophie von Spiegel zum Desenberg (1690–1751), daughter of 	Hermann Wilhelm von Spiegel zu Desenberg and Claire Anna Helena von Hornberg, on January 20, 1727, who was thereafter raised to the rank of Countess of Eppstein. He had two daughters with her:
 Louisa Charlotte (1727–1753), Countess von Eppstein
 Friederika Sophia (1730–1770), Countess von Eppstein ⚭ Baron Johann Carl Ludwig Christian von Pretlack (1716–1781) in 1764

Ernest Louis had one additional illegitimate child with Charlotte von Forstner (1686–1727):
 Friedrich Carl Ludwig von Hohenstein zu Fürstenfeld (1711–1715)

Ancestors

External links

Ernst Ludwig, Neue deutsche Biographie, Bd.: 4, Berlin, 1959
The Age of Absolutism in Hesse-Darmstadt (German)

|-

1667 births
1739 deaths
People from Gotha (town)
House of Hesse-Darmstadt
Landgraves of Hesse-Darmstadt
Modern child monarchs